Satpura Tiger Reserve (STR) also known as Satpura National Park is located in the Narmadapuram District of Madhya Pradesh in India. Its name is derived from the Satpura range. Satpura National Park, along with the adjoining Bori and Pachmarhi wildlife sanctuaries, provides  of unique central Indian highland ecosystem. It was set up in 1981.

The terrain of the national park is extremely rugged and consists of sandstone peaks, narrow gorges, ravines and dense forests.

Satpura National Park is rich in biodiversity. The animals here include leopard, sambar, chital, Indian muntjac, nilgai, four-horned antelope, Chinkara, wild boar, bear, black buck, fox, porcupine, flying squirrel, mouse deer, and Indian giant squirrel. There are a variety of birds. Hornbills and peafowl are common birds found here. The flora consists of mainly sal, teak, tendu, Phyllanthus emblica, mahua, bel, bamboo, and grasses and medicinal plants.

In previous years, there have been sightings of tigers, dholes, Indian gaur and barasingha, although these are rare.

History 
Its name is derived from the Satpura Range. Satpura is a Sanskrit word, that means seven mountains (sapta – seven and pura – mountain). It was first explored by Captain James Forsyth of Bengal Lancers in 1862 while he was searching for Indian Freedom Fighter Tantya Tope. It is one of the first declared Reserved Forest Area of India due to its ecological and commercial importance. It became a Tiger Reserve in the year 2000 and therefore it is also called Satpura Tiger Reserve (STR).

Satpura National Park, with inclusion of Pachmarhi & Bori Sanctuaries, Satpura Tiger Reserve it covers 1427 km2 of Narmadapuram and Chhindwara Districts of Madhya Pradesh.

Flora 

Satpura Tiger Reserve is a part of a rich Central Indian forest ecosystem thus it is quite rich in biodiversity. Satpura Tiger Reserve has over 1300 species of plants which are teak, Sal, tendu, mahua (Indian butter-tree), bel (stone-apple), bamboos, and grasses. Satpura Tiger Reserve has more than 62 trees species, 30 small tree species, 58 shrubs species, 32 climber species and almost 64 grass species. It also has important medicinal plants and rare endemic plants from the genus Psilotum, Cyathea, Osmunda, Lycopodium, and Lygodium. Saal is the most prominent flora of the National Park which is mainly found in the Pachmarhi plateau. The lower plains on the northern side of the park mainly consist of teak forest on basaltic traps. Many species like Melastoma malabathricum, Murraya paniculata, Holmskioldia senguinea, Blumea lanceolaria, and Sophora interrupta are found only in Satpura Tiger Reserve in Madhya Pradesh.

Grassland 
Satpura Tiger Reserve has about 10% of the area which is classified as grasslands including natural blanks on Pachmarhi plateau, anthropogenic grassland due to relocation of villages and draw down areas of Tawa reservoir. These grasslands are named Neemghan, Madai, Keria, Dhain, and Geetkheda. In addition to these, some of the new grasslands have been created by relocation of 23 villages from the core area of the reserve. Mostly all the available grasslands are of anthropogenic origin and are subjected to agriculture and grazing. If these grasslands are not manipulated, they will be invaded by woody plants and eventually disappear. High degree of protection and maintenance is done for these grasslands to support a size-able population of herbivores which are dependent on them by the Satpura Tiger Reserve administration.

Fauna 
Satpura national park, along with its surrounding buffer-zone area have a large and diversified population of wildlife which are rarely seen in other national parks. This forest area is unique in its ecosystem and has a long history of wildlife conservation which is evident from the list of wildlife species currently present. The fauna of Satpura National Park is a stunning jungle treat for wildlife enthusiasts. There are 50 species of mammals, 254 species of birds, 30 species of reptiles, and 50 species of butterflies that are found in the park. Beautiful birds species including Malabar whistling Thrush, Paradise Fly-catcher, Honey Buzzard, Malabar pied Hornbill etc. are present in large numbers. There is presence of wide variety of flower species and moist conditions thus are ideal conditions for various butterfly species to flourish like Oakleaf, Black Rajah, Great Eggfly, Blue Pancy etc.

Along with birds and butterflies its fauna comprises Spotted Deer, Indian Bison (Gaur), Tigers, Leopards, Wild boar, Wild dog (locally called Dholes), Sloth bear, Black buck (unique attraction), Porcupine, Sambhar, Barasingha, four Horned antelopes (Chowsingha), Pangolin, Marsh crocodile, Languars etc. There are about 14 species of endangered mammals and reptiles in the Satpura Tiger reserve. Indian Giant squirrel is one of the special feature of Satpura Tiger Reserve as it is rare in India now. Some of the species like Indian giant squirrels, Flying squirrels, Rhesus monkeys are endemic to the Central India.

Climate 
Satpura national park lies in Central India where moderate weather conditions prevails. Summer season prevails from March to June and during this time temperature reaches 30 °C in morning hours and 40 °C in day-time. May and June months are of peak summer time with heat waves but in higher regions the temperature remains low. Monsoon arrives in July month and lasts till September or October months. The average rainfall in the region is about 1300–1700 mm. Denwa river is the main water source of the park and Tawa dam has been built on this rivers. Its large encatchment area influences the climatic condition of national park. Winter season can be experienced from November to February during which temperature dips to 4 °C in morning hours around Pachmarhi Plateau and 15 °C in daytime. The lowest temperature is recorded as low as 1 degree in Pachmarhi. The winters are generally bright and cloudless with light showers in early November.

Other attractions 
Pandav Caves: A landmark in Satpura National Park is Pandav Caves which lend their name to the present hill station Pachmarhi of Madhya Pradesh. In line with native legends and popular beliefs, the Pandav brothers of religious text of Mahabharat, along with their wife 'Draupadi', spent some part of their exile here. 5 Ancient caves are carved out on a sandstone rock in the hills of satpura which forms the famous Pandav Caves.

Dhoopgarh Peak: Mount Dhoopgarh is the highest peak of Satpura Mountain Range of Central India and of Madhya Pradesh. It is located near the Pachmarhi in the forests of Satpura having an elevation of 1350 metres (4429 ft).

Bee Falls: Bee Falls is a waterfall located in Satpura National Park in Madhya Pradesh. There are many waterfalls located in Pachmarhi but Bee fall is most popular among tourists. It is a natural perennial water stream falling into 35 meters deep valley inside deep forest.

Denwa Backwaters: Reservoir formed by Dam built on Denwa River. It is surrounded by the Satpura National Park thus while boating in Denwa Backwaters visitors can see crocodiles and migratory bird sightings.

Shri Nagdwar Swami Temple: Shri Nagdwar Swami Temple is situated in the midst of Satpura National Park also known as Padmshesh Mandir.

Rock Paintings: Satpura Tiger Reserve is important from view point of archaeology. There are more than 50 Rock Shelters which have rock paintings depicting various animals like elephants, tigers, deers, and porcupines. These paintings are about 1500 to 10000 years old and helpful in study of human evolution history in this area.

Transportation 
The nearest airport is in Bhopal, about 190 km away. The railway station is at Itarsi, about 50 km away, is the biggest railway junction of Central India; several other stations like Narsinghpur and Pipariya are within this radius. The reserve is near to Pachmarhi hill station, which is easily accessible via road from the major cities like Jabalpur, Narsinghpur, Chindwara, Bhopal, and Betul.

See also

IUCN
Madhya Pradesh
Wildlife of India
MOEFCC
Kanha National Park

References

External links

 

Eastern Highlands moist deciduous forests
Tourist attractions in Narmadapuram district
National parks in Madhya Pradesh
Protected areas established in 1981
Tiger reserves of India
Wildlife conservation in India
1981 establishments in Madhya Pradesh
World Heritage Tentative List for India